Staiti is a comune (municipality) in the Province of Reggio Calabria in the Italian region Calabria, located about  southwest of Catanzaro and about  southeast of Reggio Calabria.

Staiti borders the following municipalities: Africo, Bova, Brancaleone, Bruzzano Zeffirio, Palizzi.

Demographic evolution

References

Cities and towns in Calabria